Narayanganj Sadar is an upazila of Narayanganj District in the Division of Dhaka, Bangladesh.

Geography
It has 113635 households and total area 100.75 km2.

Demographics
As of the 1991 Bangladesh census, Narayanganj Sadar has a population of 604561. Males constitute 55.89% of the population, and females 44.11%. This Upazila's eighteen up population is 339155. Narayanganj Sadar has an average literacy rate of 49.6% (7+ years), and the national average of 32.4% literate.

Administration
Narayanganj Sadar Upazila is divided into 10 Union Parishads and a City Corporation.

Union Parishads:
 Alirtek
 Baktaboli
 Enayetnagor
 Fatullah
 Gognagar
 Kashipur
 Kutubpur
 Siddhirganj 
 Sumil Para

The union parishads are subdivided into 56 mauzas and 132 villages.

City Corporation: 
 Narayanganj City Corporation
Narayanganj City Corporation is subdivided into 27 wards.

Upazila Chairman :Anowar Hosen (from Awami League)

Woman Vice Chairman : Ms Fatema Monir (from Awami League) 

Vice Chairman : Nazim Uddin (from Awami League)

Upazila Nirbahi Officer (UNO) : Md.Gausul Azam

Education

There are twelve colleges in the upazila. They include honors level colleges Haji Misir Ali University College, Narayanganj College, and Narayanganj Government Mohila College. Government Tolaram College, founded in 1937, is the only masters level college.

According to Banglapedia, Adarsha Girls' School and College, Narayanganj govt. Technical School and college, Deobhog Hazi Uzir Ali High School (founded in 1924), Morgan Girls High School (1910), Adarsha School Narayanganj (1906), Narayanganj Government Girls' High School, Narayanganj Ideal School (2000) and Narayanganj High School and College (1885) are notable secondary schools.

The madrasa education system includes three fazil madrasas and one kamil madrasa.

See also
 Upazilas of Bangladesh
 Districts of Bangladesh
 Divisions of Bangladesh

References

 
Upazilas of Narayanganj District